Shams al-Muluk Muhammad was the Baduspanid ruler (ustandar) of Rustamdar from 1312/3 to 1317. He was the son and successor of Kay Khusraw. 

A devout ruler, he sought to associate himself with religious scholars, and also laid the foundations to various khanqahs and mosques. He died in 1317 and was succeeded by his brother Nasir al-Din Shahriyar.

References

Sources 
 

14th-century Baduspanid rulers
1317 deaths
Year of birth unknown